Elwha may refer to:

Places
 Elwha River, a  river in Washington, US
 Elwha, Washington, an unincorporated community in Clallam County, Washington
 Elwha Dam, one of two dams on the Elwha River until being removed in 2012
 Elwha snowfinger, a perennial snowfield, separating the Elwha River and Queets River watersheds in the US

Vessels
MV Elwha, a ferry boat operated by Washington State Ferries

Native American Communities
 Lower Elwha Klallam Tribe